The Wedding Song is a 1918 Hungarian film directed by Alfréd Deésy. The film was released on 27 February 1918, first shown at the Corso Theater in Budapest. Lugosi's co-star in the film, Karoly Lajthay, later went on to direct the first film version of "Dracula", entitled Drakula halála (1923). (Lugosi had already emigrated to America by then.)

Plot
Bela Lugosi played Paul Bertram, a celebrated violinist. While on their honeymoon, Bertram and his wife are assaulted by Izau (Károly Lajthay), a rival pianist who is in love with Bertram’s wife. Bertram kills the pianist in a duel and escapes into the forest. His wife remains behind, still believing that Bertram was killed by Izau. They are later reunited when she hears her husband playing a tune that he played to her on their wedding night.

Cast
 Béla Lugosi as Paul Bertram, a famous violinist (credited as Arisztid Olt)
 Károly Lajthay as Izau (credited as Charles Lederle)
 Klara Peterdy as Sylvia
 Richard Kornay as Strom Tivadar
 Iren Barta as Bertramek Kislanya
 Karoly Hatvani as Strom Karoly

See also
 Béla Lugosi filmography

References

External links

1918 films
Hungarian black-and-white films
Hungarian silent feature films
Films directed by Alfréd Deésy
Austro-Hungarian films